This is a list of all cricketers who have captained Bermuda in an official international match. This includes One Day Internationals and ICC Trophy games.  The table is correct as of the 2007 Cricket World Cup.

One Day International

Bermuda played their first ODI on May 17, 2006

T20 International

Bermuda played their first Twenty20 International on August 3, 2008

Youth One Day Internationals

Bermuda played their first Youth ODI on February 18, 2008

ICC Trophy

Bermuda debuted in the ICC Trophy in the 1979 tournament

External links
Cricinfo
Bermuda's ICC Trophy captains at Cricket Archive 

Cricket
Bermuda